The Shadow Secretary of State for Digital, Culture, Media and Sport (DCMS), previously Shadow Secretary of State for National Heritage and Shadow Secretary of State for Culture, Media and Sport, is a position in the Official Opposition Shadow Cabinet.

The Shadow Secretary of State is the opposite number to the Secretary of State for Culture, Media and Sport, holding them and the Department for Digital, Culture, Media and Sport to account. They are the lead opposition spokesperson on digital, culture, media and sport issues.

The post was created in 1992 after John Major established the Department of National Heritage and Secretary of State for National Heritage. The National Heritage Department, and therefore the portfolio and title of the Secretary of State and Shadow Secretary of State, was replaced by Culture, Media and Sport in 1997.

In 2010, the government merged the offices of the Shadow Secretary of State for Culture, Media and Sport and Minister for the Olympics, establishing the Secretary of State for Culture, Olympics, Media and Sport. Nevertheless, the opposition retained the Shadow Minister for the Olympics and left the Shadow Secretary of State portfolio and title unchanged. The department and Secretary of State changed their titles to Digital, Culture, Media and Sport in 2017, and the opposition followed suit.

List of Shadow Secretaries of State

Shadow Secretaries of State for National Heritage (1992–97)

Shadow Secretaries of State for Culture, Media and Sport (1997–2017)

Shadow Secretaries of State for Digital, Culture, Media and Sport (2017–)

See also
 Official Opposition frontbench
Secretary of State for Digital, Culture, Media and Sport
Department for Digital, Culture, Media and Sport

Official Opposition (United Kingdom)